Alfredia is a genus of flowering plants in the family Asteraceae described as a genus in 1816.

Alfredia is native to Central Asia and western China.

 Species
 Alfredia acantholepis Kar. & Kir. - Xinjiang, Altai, Kazakhstan, Kyrgyzstan, Uzbekistan
 Alfredia aspera C.Shih - Xinjiang
 Alfredia cernua (L.) Cass.  - Xinjiang, Altai, Kazakhstan
 Alfredia fetissowii Iljin - Xinjiang, Kyrgyzstan
 Alfredia integrifolia (Iljin) Tulyag. - Central Asia
 Alfredia nivea Kar. & Kir. - Xinjiang, Altai, Kazakhstan, Kyrgyzstan, Uzbekistan
 Alfredia talassica Korovin ex Iljin - Turkmenistan

References

Asteraceae genera
Cynareae